Ex on the Beach is a British reality television series that is broadcast on MTV. The series was first announced in February 2014, and premiered on 22 April 2014. The series is narrated by Andrew Maxwell. Ex on the Beach follows the format of cast members staying abroad and beginning relationships, which are typically interrupted by their exes arriving at various points throughout the series. MTV in the United States airs an American version of the series.

On 20 March 2019, it was confirmed that transmission of the tenth series had been cancelled following the suicide of cast member Mike Thalassitis. Producers decided not to air any of the episodes from the series, and did not reveal the rest of the cast members involved in the series. From 2020, celebrity versions of the series have aired.

Regular series

Series 1 (2014)

The first series of the show was announced in February 2014 and premiered on MTV on 22 April 2014. The series ran for eight episodes and concluded on 10 June 2014. The official list of cast members was released on 13 March 2014 and includes four single boys: Ashley Cain, Jack Lomax, Liam Lewis and Marco Alexandre; as well as four single girls: Chloe Goodman, Emily Gillard, Farah Sattaur and Vicky Pattison. It was announced that Geordie Shore star Vicky Pattison would be taking part in the series; she was joined by ex-fiancé and former Geordie Shore co-star Ricci Guarnaccio as well as Australian fling Daniel Conn who featured briefly in series 6 of Geordie Shore. On 7 January 2015, cast member Chloe Goodman entered the Celebrity Big Brother house to compete in the fifteenth series. However she became the first Housemate to be evicted. Ashley later returned for Series 2 as an ex, while Vicky returned in the third series. Liam and Chloe both returned again for Series 5, while Ashley and Joss made appearances as exes. Ross was another cast member from this series to make a return, this time during Series 6.

Series 2 (2015)

The second series of the show began airing on 27 January 2015 and ran for eight episodes, concluding on 17 March 2015. This was confirmed on 23 July 2014 when it was announced that filming would begin soon, with the series airing in 2015. The official list of cast members was released on 6 January 2015. It included four single boys: Connor Hunter, Luke Goodfellow, Morgan Evans and Rogan O'Connor, as well as four single girls: Anita Kaushik, Kayleigh Morris, Loren Green and Melissa Reeves. It was also announced that Geordie Shore stars Charlotte Crosby and Gary Beadle would be taking part in the series.

Ahead of the launch of the new series, it was confirmed that Series 1 cast member Ashley Cain would be returning for the second series as an ex. Rogan later returned for the third series, while Jess and Gary both returned for the fifth series as main cast, with Kayleigh and Melissa appearing as exes. Kayleigh also went on to appear in the eighteenth series of Big Brother in 2017, but was removed from the house on Day 13 due to threatening behaviour. In 2018, Jess Impiazzi, an ex during this series went onto appear in the twenty-first series of Celebrity Big Brother.

Series 3 (2015)

The third series of the show began on 11 August 2015. The official list of cast members was released on 14 July 2015. This series was filmed in Cancun, Mexico, making this the first series to be filmed outside of Europe. They include four boys: Graham Griffiths, Jayden Robins, Kirk Norcross and Stephen Bear, and four girls: Amy Paige Cooke, Laura Alicia Summers, Megan McKenna and Megan Rees. With the announcement of the line-up it was confirmed that former Geordie Shore cast member and star of the first series, Vicky Pattison, would be making her return as an ex alongside Series 2 star Rogan O'Connor. The Only Way Is Essex cast member Kirk Norcross was also confirmed to be taking part in the series, with his ex-fiancée and Celebrity Big Brother star Cami-Li featuring as his ex. Star of Magaluf Weekender Jordan Davies was also revealed to be taking part in the series, also featuring as an ex. Megan McKenna and Jordan later returned for the fourth series. On 5 January 2016, cast member Megan McKenna entered the Celebrity Big Brother house to compete in the seventeenth series, and on 28 July 2016, Stephen Bear entered the house to compete in the eighteenth series where he left as the winner. Jordan Davies made another return to the show, this time during the fifth series with Jemma and Bear, and Holly also returning as an ex again. In August 2017, both Jemma Lucy and Jordan Davies took part in the twentieth series of Celebrity Big Brother.

Series 4 (2016)

The fourth series of the show began on 19 January 2016. This series was filmed in Portugal. The official cast list was revealed on 15 December 2015 and includes four girls: Helen Briggs, Nancy-May Turner, Naomi Hedman and Olivia Walsh, as well as four boys: Joe Delaney, Lewis Good, Youssef Hassane and Geordie Shore star Scotty T. Megan McKenna and Magaluf Weekender cast member Jordan Davies would be returning to the series as exes, having previously appeared during the previous series. Olivia later returned to the beach for the fifth series, while Kieran Lee went onto appear in the eighteenth series of Big Brother, but was evicted during the final week.

Series 5 (2016)

The fifth series of the show began on 16 August 2016. This series took place in Koh Samui, Thailand. The series was confirmed on 8 March 2016 after the finale of the fourth series. It was also announced that faces from the past would return for this series with "unfinished business". The official list of cast members were released on 5 July 2016. It features four boys and four girls from previous series. From the first series it includes Chloe Goodman and Liam Lewis. Geordie Shore star Gary Beadle and Jess Impiazzi return having previously appeared in the second series, while Jemma Lucy, Jordan Davies and Stephen Bear from the third series all return. Finally Olivia Walsh returns having previously appeared in series 4. Over the course of the series they will be joined by their exes, which also include familiar faces. Series 1's Ashley Cain will be making his third appearance on the show, while Joss Mooney also returns. Kayleigh Morris and Melissa Reeves will be back having already appeared in the second series. Holly Rickwood from Series 3 will also be back on the beach. New cast members include Lillie Lexie Gregg, Charlotte Dawson, David Hawley, Aimee Kimber, Conor Scurlock and Alex Stewart. While the series was airing, Stephen Bear took part in the eighteenth series of Celebrity Big Brother. He later went on to win the series. Kayleigh also went on to appear in the eighteenth series of Big Brother in 2017, but was removed from the house on Day 13 due to threatening behaviour. Later in the year, in August 2017, both Jemma Lucy and Jordan Davies took part in the twentieth series of Celebrity Big Brother, who were both followed by Jess Impiazzi, who later went onto appear in the twenty-first series.

Series 6 (2017)

The sixth series of the show began on 17 January 2017. This series was filmed on location in Crete, Greece. The series was confirmed on 2 November 2016. The official list of cast members included four boys; Alex Leslie, Josh Ritchie, Ross Worsick and Sean Pratt, and four girls; Harriette Harper, Maisie Gillespie, Zahida Allen and ZaraLena Jackson. Ross has previously appeared in the first series of the show whereas Josh featured in the first series of Love Island. With the announcement of the line-up it was also confirmed that Geordie Shore star Aaron Chalmers would be arriving on the beach as an ex as well as former The Only Way Is Essex cast member Nicole Bass. Chanelle McCleary, an ex from this series, later went onto appear in the eighteenth series of Big Brother but was evicted a week before the final.

Series 7 (2017)

The seventh series of the show began on 20 June 2017. This series was filmed on location on the island of Bali in Indonesia. The cast members for the series were confirmed on 23 May 2017 which include Geordie Shore stars Chloe Ferry and Marty McKenna, Love Island contestants Max Morley and Josh Ritchie, as well as Beauty School Cop Outs cast member Savannah Kemplay. Marty and Josh had previously appeared in the third and sixth series of the show respectively.

Series 8 (2018)

The eighth series of the show is expected to begin on 20 March 2018, and was filmed in Spain. The series was confirmed in August 2017. The cast for this series was revealed on 20 February 2018, and includes Geordie Shore star Marnie Simpson as well as The X Factor contestant, and Stereo Kicks and Union J singer Casey Johnson, and former Ibiza Weekender star Laura Louise.

Series 9 (2018)

The ninth series began on 15 August 2018, and concluded on 31 October 2018 following twelve episodes, making this the longest series to date. The series was confirmed at the end of the eighth series final episode in May 2018. The cast members for this series were confirmed on 23 July 2018, and features former Made in Chelsea cast member Daisy Robins, as well as The Valleys star Natalee Harris. Jack Delvin, who previously appeared in the sixth series, returned to this series once again, this time as another ex. The series was filmed in Tulum, Mexico.

Series 10 (Unaired)
The tenth series of Ex on the Beach was set to premiere in spring 2019, but the broadcast was cancelled after the death of Mike Thalassitis, a cast member featured on the series. None of the other cast members featured on the tenth series were announced.

Celebrity series

Series 1 (2020)

The first series of Celebrity Ex on the Beach, began airing 21 January 2020, and concluded on 28 April 2020. The cast includes Olympic athlete Ashley McKenzie, television personality Calum Best, The Only Way Is Essex star Joey Essex, and Love Island stars Michael Griffiths and Georgia Harrison, The Valleys star Lateysha Grace, playboy model Lorena Medina and Mob Wives star Marissa Jade.

Series 2 (2022)

The second series of Celebrity Ex on the Beach, will begin airing in 2022. The cast includes RuPaul's Drag Race UK queen A'Whora, The Only Way Is Essex cast member James "Lockie" Lock, star of Too Hot To Handle Kori Sampson, Love Island UK islanders Kaz Crossley, Megan Barton-Hanson and Michael Boateng, Married at First Sight Australia cast member KC Osborne, Geordie Shore'''s Nathan Henry and Love Island Sweden islander Sofie Karlstad. This series was filmed in Gran Canaria.

Celeb Ex in the City
A new spin-off show was launched in late 2020 with an altered format. Each episode features 2 celebrities going on a blind date in a London reasturant with their ex arriving halfway through. At the end of the date, the celebrity must decide who between the two to continue to date.

Series 1 (2020–2021)
The series was filmed according to social distancing guidelines as a result of the COVID-19 pandemic. The series premiered on 8 December 2020. The cast featured Love Island UK stars Megan Barton-Hanson, Michael Griffiths, Jon Clark, Amy Hart and Jess Gale, television personality Calum Best, The Only Way Is Essex stars Liam ‘Gatsby’ Blackwell and Charlie King, former Hollyoaks actor Malique Thompson-Dwyer, RuPaul's Drag Race UK star Gothy Kendoll, former Sugababes member Amelle Berrabah and Big Brother UK star Aisleyne Horgan-Wallace. Some notable exes included media personality Summer Monteys-Fulham, Love Island stars Charlie Brake, Nabila Badda and Ched Uzor, The X Factor UK contestant Bradley Hunt, fitness model Waz Ashayer and Tinder’s most swiped right man Stefan-Pierre Tomlin.

Series 2 (2021)
The second series is slated to premiere on 20 October 2021. The cast featured Love Island UK stars Leanne Amaning, Eve Gale, Arabella Chi, Josh Ritchie and Jack Fincham, Big Brother UK 7 star Imogen Thomas, A Place in the Sun presenter Danni Menzies, The Only Way Is Essex stars Bobby Norris and Demi Sims, The Circle UK stars Manrika Khaira and Freddie Bentley, rugby union player Levi Davis, Ibiza Weekender stars Callum Izzard and Deano Bailey, RuPaul's Drag Race UK contestant Tia Kofi and Olympic gymnast Lisa Mason.

Cast

Ex on the Beach: Body SOS
On 12 December 2017 it was announced that Vicky Pattison would host a spin-off show entitled "Ex on the Beach: Body SOS" where she will attempt to help members of the public to get into shape. The first series began airing on 17 January 2018 and features Joss Mooney, who rose to fame by appearing in the first series of Ex on the Beach''.

International versions

References

External links
 
 

2014 British television series debuts
2010s British reality television series
2020s British reality television series
British dating and relationship reality television series
English-language television shows

MTV original programming